SOR BN 8,5 is a model of partly low-floor minibus manufactured by Czech company SOR Libchavy. Bus is designed for urban transport and deployed on lines where sufficient vehicles with a smaller capacity, where due to the cramped conditions on the communication vehicles are small and suitable for service lines to medical and sanitary facilities and offices.

Construction features 
Model BN 8,5 is similar to the model SOR CN 8,5, from which it differs mainly with automatic transmission. Vehicles supplied for MHD Chrudim and for public transport in Frýdek-Místek (ČSAD Frýdek-Místek), however, have a mechanical six-speed transmission.

Production and operation 
Bus is produced since 2010 until now.

See also 

Buses of the Czech Republic
Buses manufactured by SOR